Johan Hallström, born Johan Nils Hallström (born 4 March 1976), is a Swedish actor, who studied at Teaterhögskolan i Stockholm. He is the son of film director Lasse Hallström and TV producer Malou Hallström. He is also grandson of Prima Ballerina, Brita Appelgren. He has worked in feature films, TV-series, theater and short films.  

In theater, he has worked at The Royal Dramatic Theater, Stockholm City Theater and Malmö City Theater, among many others.

He has worked with actors such as Mikael Nyqvist, Krister Henriksson, Mikael Persbrandt, Dominic Monaghan and Noomi Rapace.

Filmography
• 2017 - Hassel

• 2016  - The View from the Man Hanging Upside Down

• 2015 - Tsatsiki Dad and the Olive War

• 2015 - 100 Code

• 2013 - The Sandhamn Murders

• 2013 - Wallander 
2012 - The Hypnotist
2011 - 30 Degrees in February 
2011 - Once upon a time in Phuket 
2008 - Gnomes and Trolls - The Secret Chamber
2007 - Darling - salesman
2007 - Beck - Det tysta skriket - technician
2007 - Beck – Den svaga länken - technician
2006 - Ville och Vilda Kanin ... mer vild än tam - Ville
2006 - Du & jag - Niklas
2003 - Avstigning för samtliga - police man Fredrik
2000 - Ensam, tvåsam, tveksam - young man in subway

References

External links

Male actors from Stockholm
1976 births
Living people